Edith Hope Goddard Iselin (January 17, 1868 – April 5, 1970) was an American heiress and sportswoman who was the first American woman to compete as a crew member in the America's Cup yacht race. She also owned thoroughbred racehorses.

Early life
Hope Goddard was the daughter of Mary Edith (née Jenckes) Goddard (1844–1921) and Colonel William Goddard (1825–1907) of Providence, Rhode Island, a chancellor of Brown University and a scion of a family that had accumulated great wealth from mercantile and manufacturing activities.

Life
Hope and her husband Oliver had many extravagant homes, including their primary residence in New Rochelle, New York, "All View", a palatial waterfront estate on a private peninsula overlooking Long Island Sound. The home was designed by renown architect Stanford White. Fredrick Law Olmsted, who designed Central Park, was their personal landscape architect. A breakwater was constructed adjacent to Premium Point in Echo Bay so that they could dock their yachts including the Vigilant, Defender and Columbia safely next to their home. The Iselins were influential in bringing the popularity of yacht racing to the Long Island Sound shore communities of Westchester, making New Rochelle the focal point of all the pre-racing activities.

Philanthropy
Although Mrs. Iselin walked among kings and multi-millionaires, she and her husband were noted for their philanthropies. In Aiken, South Carolina, where the Iselins maintained a winter residence named "Hopelands", they organized the Aiken Hospital and Relief Society, which built and equipped Aiken's first hospital in 1917. They continued to support the hospital until it was replaced by the county hospital in 1937.

Iselin also served as a director of the Martha Schofield School for many years, when it was operated under private auspices for the education of young African-Americans. On her death she bequeathed Hopelands Gardens, where the Aiken Thoroughbred Racing Hall of Fame and Museum is located, to the city of Aiken. There is a bust of Hope Goddard Iselin at Hopeland Gardens that was sculpted by Maria Kirby Smith.

Personal life
In 1894, she married C. Oliver Iselin, a banker and sportsman who Time magazine said was "probably the most famed yachtsman in the U.S." during the latter part of the 19th Century.  The headline of their wedding announcement in the May 5, 1896 New York Times read, "Hope Goddard Engaged to C.O. Iselin, Well-Known Yachtsman to Marry Heiress of millions." Twenty-six-year-old Hope Goddard was in line to inherit a huge fortune.  C. Oliver Iselin was already a millionaire at the age of 40, made wealthy by his grandfather's investments in coal mining and railroads. Together, the Iselin's had a son, who died in childhood, and a daughter:

 William Goddard Iselin (1903-1909), who died young. 
 Edith Hope Iselin (1905-2001), who married Archer G. Jones.

Iselin died in her home in Aiken, South Carolina in 1970 at the age of 102.

References

External links
 
 

1868 births
1970 deaths
Philanthropists from New York (state)
American racehorse owners and breeders
American female sailors (sport)
America's Cup sailors
Sportspeople from Providence, Rhode Island
Sportspeople from New Rochelle, New York
Sportspeople from Aiken, South Carolina
American centenarians
Iselin family
Women centenarians
Social leaders